The Charles J. Thompson House, now known as the Mansion Museum, is a historic building located in Forest City, Iowa, United States. It was designed in the Georgian Revival style by William Jean Beauley of the Chicago architectural firm of Peabody and Beauley. The house was built for a local banker named Charles J. Thompson. The two-story brick structure follows a rectangular plan. It features a hipped roof with deck and a symmetrical facade. The large portico with fluted columns in the Corinthian order and pilasters is the central feature of the house. The house was acquired by the Winnebago Historical Society, which operates it as a local history museum. It was listed on the National Register of Historic Places in 1978.

References

Houses completed in 1900
Georgian Revival architecture in Iowa
Houses on the National Register of Historic Places in Iowa
Museums in Winnebago County, Iowa
History museums in Iowa
National Register of Historic Places in Winnebago County, Iowa